Birkenhead  is a constituency represented in the House of Commons of the UK Parliament since 2019 by Mick Whitley of the Labour Party.

Profile
The constituency of Birkenhead covers the town of Birkenhead, on the Wirral Peninsula, and the Birkenhead suburbs of Bidston, Claughton, Oxton, Prenton, Rock Ferry and Tranmere. It forms the relatively densely populated mid-east of four parliamentary constituencies within the Metropolitan Borough of Wirral, itself a major contributor to (and the ex-Cheshire part of) the Metropolitan County of Merseyside envisaged in 1958 and created in 1974, considered as any other county (albeit with very limited powers and no elected councillors) for the enacted purposes of the Boundary Commission in its periodic reports.

The urban parts of the town unite with Liverpool on the opposite side of the narrows of the estuary in having an early socially reformist movement in local measures, and its choice of many elected representatives since the 1850s. The work was evidenced in the building of large public buildings and institutions and the creation of supported workers' housing, creating Port Sunlight to the south, among other such estates. The southern border of the borough controversially avoids the near-circular suburbs of the cathedral city of Chester, thereby creating a jagged boundary in local and national government; nonetheless, the Wirral has scenic shores and large golf courses including to the west one which regularly hosts The Open. Transcending the dense 20th-century urban-semi-rural divide of Merseyside is the largely Victorian era-built town of Birkenhead, at the centre of which lies the archetype of city parks, Birkenhead Park, a social gift and early publicly subscribed community asset in the area.

The seat is almost square and bounded by its sole motorway to the west. Its homes were (at the 2011 UK Census) 53% owner-occupied compared to 60% in the region. The seat's entirely left-wing victories nationally since 1945 evidence commitment locally to public services and wealth redistribution, rather than laissez-faire economics and low taxation. The 2015 general election result made the seat the fifteenth-safest of Labour's 232 seats by percentage of majority.

History
Birkenhead was enfranchised in 1861 by the Appropriation of Seats (Sudbury and Saint Alban's) Act 1861 as a single-member Parliamentary Borough. It was first contested at the 1865 general election and continued as a single-seat constituency until it was split between Birkenhead East and Birkenhead West under the terms of the Representation of the People Act 1918 which took effect for the 1918 general election.

Under the Representation of the People Act 1948, coming into effect at the 1950 general election, the constituency was re-established with revised boundaries.

Boundaries

1861–1918: The enfranchising Act provided that the constituency was to consist of the Extra-parochial Chapelry of Birkenhead, the several townships of Claughton, Tranmere, and Oxton, and so much of the township of Higher Bebington as lies to the eastward of the road leading from Higher Tranmere to Lower Bebington.

The boundaries were not altered by the Boundaries Act 1868 or the Redistribution of Seats Act 1885.

1950–1974: The County Borough of Birkenhead, except the wards included in the Bebington constituency (i.e. the wards of Bebington, Devonshire, Egerton, Mersey, and Prenton).

Comprised the majority of the expanded County Borough, incorporating Birkenhead West, parts of Birkenhead East and parts transferred from Wirral.

1974–1983: The County Borough of Birkenhead wards of Argyle, Bebington, Cathcart, Claughton, Cleveland, Clifton, Devonshire, Egerton, Gilbrook, Grange, Holt, Mersey, Oxton, and St James.

Gained the Bebington, Devonshire, Egerton and Mersey wards from the abolished constituency of Bebington.  Upton ward transferred to Wirral.

From 1 April 1974 until the next boundary review came into effect for the 1983 general election, the constituency comprised parts of the Metropolitan Borough of Wirral in Merseyside but its boundaries were unchanged.

1983–2010: The Metropolitan Borough of Wirral wards of Bidston, Birkenhead, Claughton, Egerton, Oxton, and Tranmere.

Boundaries broadly unchanged.

2010–present: The Metropolitan Borough of Wirral wards of Bidston and St James, Birkenhead and Tranmere, Claughton, Oxton, Prenton, and Rock Ferry.

Boundaries changed to reflect new ward boundaries. Prenton transferred from Wirral West.

Political history

1865–1918 
The seat's elections were won by Conservatives with one exception, the 1906 landslide victory for the Liberal Party.

1918–1950 (seats split) 
The two seats alternated frequently between the three largest parties in the 1920s, before the 1931 and 1935 general elections, which saw a major Conservative and Unionist Party victory (standing as Unionist in this area) in Birkenhead West, the latter election heralding a ten-year Parliament. However, the Liberal Graham White, of the more radical faction, won the eastern seat at both elections, echoing his victory in 1922. Having had predominantly marginal majorities, the seats were firmly won by the Labour Party in their nationwide landslide victory of 1945.

Since 1950 re-creation 
Since 1950, Birkenhead has returned Labour MPs with large and generally increasing majorities — apart from a 7% majority in 1955.

Frank Field, who represented the constituency from 1979 to 2019, was appointed as Welfare Reform Minister in the First Blair ministry in 1997 but served for just for one year. He chaired the Work and Pensions Select Committee from 2015 to 2019. In the 2017 general election he received 77% of the vote, achieving a majority of 58%. However, he resigned from the Labour whip in August 2018, citing anti-semitism in the party. In the 2019 general election he stood as a candidate of the Birkenhead Social Justice Party but he lost easily to the Labour Party candidate, gaining only 17% of the vote.

Minor party candidates 
Two Communist candidates, including Barry Williams, stood between 1950 and 1970, obtaining a high point of 1.5% of the votes cast.

More recently, at the 2001, 2005 and 2010 general elections no candidates apart from those selected by the Labour, Conservative, and Liberal Democrat parties contested the seat. The 2015 general election result saw the Liberal Democrat candidate fall behind the Green candidate, with both parties narrowly losing their deposits, as they did in 2017 and 2019. The Brexit Party stood at the 2019 general election, also losing its deposit.

Members of Parliament

MPs 1861–1918

MPs since 1950

Elections

Elections in the 2010s

Elections in the 2000s

Elections in the 1990s

Elections in the 1980s

Elections in the 1970s

Elections in the 1960s

Elections in the 1950s

Elections in the 1910s

Elections in the 1900s

Elections in the 1890s

Elections in the 1880s

Elections in the 1870s

 Caused by Laird's death.

Elections in the 1860s

While the seat was created in 1861, it is considered a new seat for the purposes of the 1865 general election.

See also
List of parliamentary constituencies in Merseyside
History of parliamentary constituencies and boundaries in Cheshire

Notes

References

Sources

Parliamentary constituencies in North West England
Constituencies of the Parliament of the United Kingdom established in 1861
Constituencies of the Parliament of the United Kingdom disestablished in 1918
Constituencies of the Parliament of the United Kingdom established in 1950
Birkenhead